Edmonson is an unincorporated community in Benton County, Missouri, United States.

A post office called Edmonson was established in 1886, and remained in operation until 1916. The community has the name of a local family.

References

Unincorporated communities in Benton County, Missouri
Unincorporated communities in Missouri